Science Translational Medicine is an interdisciplinary medical journal established in October 2009 by the American Association for the Advancement of Science.
It covers basic, translational, and clinical research on human diseases. According to Web of Science, the journal has a 2021 impact factor of 19.319

Abstracting and indexing
The journal is abstracted and indexed by the major services with a focus on medicine and biology, including Science Citation Index
 & Web of Science, Index Medicus/MEDLINE/PubMed, and Scopus

References

External links 
 

Weekly journals
English-language journals
Publications established in 2009
General medical journals
American Association for the Advancement of Science academic journals
Translational medicine